There have been nine baronetcies created for persons with the surname Moore, two in the Baronetage of England, one in the Baronetage of Ireland, two in the Baronetage of Great Britain and four in the Baronetage of the United Kingdom. As of 2014 two creations are extant and one is considered dormant.

The Moore Baronetcy, of Fawley in the County of Berkshire, was created in the Baronetage of England on 21 May 1627 for Henry Moore. The title became extinct on the death of the sixth Baronet in 1807.

The Moore Baronetcy, of Mayds Morton in the County of Buckingham, was created in the Baronetage of England on 26 July 1665 for George Moore. The title became extinct on his death in 1678.

The Moore Baronetcy, of Rosscarbery in the County of Cork, Ireland was created in the Baronetage of Ireland on 29 June 1681 for Emanuel Moore. The title became extinct or dormant on the death of the eleventh Baronet in 1926.

The Moore Baronetcy, of Jamaica in the West Indies, was created in the Baronetage of Great Britain on 28 January 1764 for the colonial administrator Henry Moore. The title became extinct on the death of the second Baronet in 1780.

The Moore Baronetcy, of the Navy, was created in the Baronetage of Great Britain on 4 March 1766 for John Moore. The title became extinct on his death in 1779.

The Moore Baronetcy, of Hancox in Whatlington in the County of Sussex, was created in the Baronetage of the United Kingdom on 28 May 1919 for Norman Moore, President of the Royal College of Physicians from 1918 to 1921. The third Baronet did not use his title. The journalist Charles Moore is the son of Richard Gillachrist Moore, brother of the third Baronet.

The Moore Baronetcy, of Colchester in the County of Essex, was created in the Baronetage of the United Kingdom on 25 October 1923 for Edward Cecil Moore, Lord Mayor of London from 1922 to 1923. The title became extinct on the death of his grandson, the second Baronet, in 1992.

The Moore Baronetcy, of Moore Lodge in the County of Antrim, was created in the Baronetage of the United Kingdom on 20 June 1932 for William Moore, Lord Chief Justice of Northern Ireland from 1925 to 1937. The third Baronet was Deputy Lieutenant of County Antrim in 1990.

The Moore Baronetcy, of Kyleburn in the County of Ayr, was created in the Baronetage of the United Kingdom on 20 September 1956 for the Conservative politician Thomas Moore. The title became extinct on his death in 1971.

Moore baronets, of Fawley (1627)
Sir Henry Moore, 1st Baronet (died c. 1633)
Sir Henry Moore, 2nd Baronet (died )
Sir Richard Moore, 3rd Baronet (died 1737)
Sir Richard Moore, 4th Baronet (died 1738)
Sir John Moore, 5th Baronet (died 1790)
Sir Thomas Moore, 6th Baronet (died 1807)

Moore baronets, of Mayds Morton (1665)
Sir George Moore, 1st Baronet (–1678)

Moore baronets, of Rosscarbery (1681)
Sir Emanuel Moore, 1st Baronet (died )
Sir William Moore, 2nd Baronet (1663–1693) M.P. for Bandon.
Sir Emanuel Moore, 3rd Baronet (1685–c. 1733) sat as M.P. for Downpatrick.
Sir Charles Moore, 4th Baronet (died 1754)
Sir Robert Moore, 5th Baronet (died c. 1758)
Sir William Moore, 6th Baronet (died c. 1783)
Sir Emanuel Moore, 7th Baronet (1722–1793)
Sir Richard Moore, 8th Baronet (1744–c. 1815)
Sir Emanuel Moore, 9th Baronet (1786–1849)
Sir Richard Emanuel Moore, 10th Baronet (1810–1882)
Sir Thomas O'Connor Moore, 11th Baronet (1845–1926) married in 1908 Katherine Matilda, only child of Capt. John George Elphinstone, H.E.I.C.S, of Aberdeen and Passage West, by Katherine, daughter of George Richard Pain, architect, of Cork.
Title dormant or extinct on his death. There are possible claimants in the United States, descendants of Charles Moore, a younger son of Sir Emmanuel Moore, 9th Baronet

Jerry Moore (1942–2010) claimed to be the ninth Baronet's descendant and assumed the title of 12th Baronet. His son, Douglas Cameron Alexander Moore (b. 1970), assumed the title of 13th Baronet. But they have not successfully proved their succession to the baronetcy, thus they aren't entitled to be addressed as Baronets.

Moore baronets, of Jamaica (1764)
Sir Henry Moore, 1st Baronet (1713–1769)
Sir John Henry Moore, 2nd Baronet (1756–1780)

Moore baronets, of the Navy (1766)

Sir John Moore, 1st Baronet (1718–1779)

Moore baronets, of Hancox (1919)
Sir Norman Moore, 1st Baronet (1847–1922)
Sir Alan Hilary Moore, 2nd Baronet (1882–1959)
Sir Norman Winfrid Moore, 3rd Baronet (1923–2015) (did not use the title)
Sir Peter Alan Cutlack Moore, 4th Baronet (born 1951)

The heir apparent is the present holder's son Paul Edwardes Moore (born 1990).

Moore baronets, of Colchester (1923)
Sir Edward Cecil Moore, 1st Baronet (1851–1923)
Sir Edward Stanton Moore, 2nd Baronet (1910–1992)

Moore baronets, of Moore Lodge (1932)

Sir William Moore, 1st Baronet (1864–1944)
Sir William Samson Moore, 2nd Baronet (1891–1978)
Sir William Roger Clotworthy Moore, 3rd Baronet (1927–2019)
Sir Richard William Moore, 4th Baronet (born 1955)

There is no heir.

Moore baronets, of Kyleburn (1956)
Sir Thomas Moore, 1st Baronet (1886–1971)

Notes

References
Kidd, Charles, Williamson, David (editors). Debrett's Peerage and Baronetage (1990 edition). New York: St Martin's Press, 1990, 

Baronetcies in the Baronetage of Ireland
Baronetcies in the Baronetage of the United Kingdom
Dormant baronetcies
Extinct baronetcies in the Baronetage of England
Extinct baronetcies in the Baronetage of Great Britain
Extinct baronetcies in the Baronetage of the United Kingdom
1627 establishments in England
1681 establishments in Ireland
1764 establishments in Great Britain
1919 establishments in the United Kingdom